The Asia/Oceania Zone is one of the three zones of regional Davis Cup competition in 2011.

In the Asia/Oceania Zone there are four different groups in which teams compete against each other to advance to the next group.

Participating teams

Seeds

Remaining Nations

Draw

 and  relegated to Group III in 20.
 promoted to Group I in 20.

First round

South Korea vs. Syria

Hong Kong vs. Pakistan

Iran vs. Indonesia

Pacific Oceania vs. Thailand

Playoff round

Hong Kong vs. Syria

Pacific Oceania vs. Iran

Second round

South Korea vs. Pakistan

Thailand vs. Indonesia

Third round

South Korea vs. Thailand

References

External links
 Davis Cup draw details

Asia Oceania Zone Group II
Davis Cup Asia/Oceania Zone